The Berlin Conference may refer to:
Congress of Berlin (1878), concerning the aftermath of the Russo-Turkish War and the political future of the Balkans
Berlin Conference (1884–85), concerning the Scramble for Africa
Berlin Conference (1897), an international congress regarding the growing number of leprosy cases
Berlin Conference (1945), an older alternative name for the Potsdam Conference
Berlin Conference (1954), concerning the Cold War
1976 Conference of Communist and Workers Parties of Europe, Meeting of European communist parties
Iran After the Elections conference (2000), also known as Berlin Conference 
Berlin Conference (2020) , concerning the Second Libyan Civil War